Alfred Eisele (26 April 1947 – 28 February 2014) was an Austrian footballer. He played in two matches for the Austria national football team in 1969.

References

External links
 

1947 births
2014 deaths
Austrian footballers
Austria international footballers
Place of birth missing
Association football midfielders
SC Eisenstadt players
Austrian football managers